"Anthem for a Lost Cause" is a song by Welsh alternative rock band Manic Street Preachers. It is the second single released from the band's eleventh studio album, Rewind the Film.

Background

Both song and lyrics were written by singer James Dean Bradfield. In an interview, Bradfield stated that the song was about the question of if lyrics today are as important as they were before.

The music video features Tori Lyons, who previously starred in the video for "Show Me the Wonder", reprising her role as a miner's wife in the 1984 miners' strike. The band stated that Kieran Evans was important for this video as they wanted to capture the feeling of the 80s and how women dealt with the strike. In the video, we see a woman that is trying to survive without her husband.

Release

The song was made available by digital download on 25 November 2013, backed up by two songs Death of a Digital Ghost and See It Like Sutherland. A live version of She Is Suffering at the O2 Arena in 2011 was also in the single digital download. It peaked on number 200 in the UK Singles Chart.

Track listing

Personnel 

 Manic Street Preachers

 James Dean Bradfield – lead vocals, guitar
 Nicky Wire – bass guitar
 Sean Moore – drums

Other personnel
 Loz Williams - production, keyboards
 Gavin Fitzjohn - horn arrangement, trumpets
 Sean Read - horn arrangement, trumpets

Charts

References

External links 
 The Quietus article on the song
 Digital Spy article on the song
 Exclaim! article on the song

Manic Street Preachers songs
2013 singles
Songs based on actual events
Columbia Records singles
Songs written by James Dean Bradfield
Songs written by Nicky Wire
Songs written by Sean Moore (musician)
2013 songs